Smile TV is a channel on television in Greece which broadcasts cartoons and other shows for children ages four to eleven.

Programming
The Last of the Mohicans
Sandokan: The Tiger roars again
Journey to the West – Legends of the Monkey King
Mimi and Mr. Bobo
Cloud Trotters
Vitaminix
Pocket Dragon Adventures
Ben 10
Princess of the Nile

Els Nimbes
Extreme Dinosaurs
Horseland
Popples
Adventures of Sonic the Hedgehog
Oggy and the Cockroaches
Sabrina: The Animated Series
Marsupilami
The Adventures of Voopa the Goolash
Rabbids Invasion
Gormiti Nature Unleashed
Kerwhizz
Power Rangers Jungle Fury
Vipo: Adventures of the Flying Dog
Dinofroz
Angel's Friends
Monster High
Pac-Man and the Ghostly Adventures
DiMiTRi
Dragon Ball Z
Digimon Fusion
Glitter Force
The Adventures of Super Mario Bros. 3
Dennis the Menace
Kong: The Animated Series
Puppy In My Pocket
The Smurfs
Rat-A-Tat
HeartCatch PreCure!
Kaeloo
Chloe's Closet
Super 4

Co-operations
The channel is known for being co-operated with stations that show its whole programming or part of it, under its banner.
Vergina TV – sister channel, operating since 1993 in Central Macedonia. Formerly airing cartoons from the lineup of Smile TV, till 2017.
NET – showed cartoons from the Smile TV lineup, from 2015 to 2018.
Smile+ – sister channel and successor of local Thessalian station Zeus TV. Started operating on October 7, 2016.
KRITI TV1 – showing cartoons from the Smile TV lineup.
Smile++ – sister channel and successor of local Macedonian station Super TV. Started operating in October 2017, and stopped on April 27, 2018.
Smile_ – sister channel and successor of local Thracian station Egnatia TV. Airing cartoons after approval from the National Television Council on March 6, 2017.

References

External links
 
Smile TV Cyprus

Television channels in Greece
Mass media in Athens
Television channels and stations established in 1999
1999 establishments in Greece
Children's television networks